The Here and Now Tour is a series of concert tours, which began in 2001, featuring groups and singers famous in the 1980s. The Tour takes in arenas and theatres around the UK and still runs today. The tours are organised by Tony Denton Promotions. The tour has now progressed to countries such as Japan and Australia as well as several European countries.

Artists who have performed
1927
A Flock of Seagulls
ABC
Altered Images
Bananarama 
The Beat
Belinda Carlisle
Belle Stars
Billy Ocean
Boy George
Brother Beyond
Bucks Fizz
Captain Sensible
Chas & Dave
Chesney Hawkes
China Crisis
Curiosity Killed the Cat
Cutting Crew
Doctor and the Medics
Five Star
Go West
Hazel O'Connor
Heaven 17
Howard Jones
The Human League
Imagination
Jason Donovan
Jimmy Somerville
Johnny Hates Jazz
Kajagoogoo
Katrina Leskanich
Kid Creole and the Coconuts
Kim Wilde
Limahl
Living in a Box
Marc Almond
Midge Ure
Modern Romance
Mondo Rock
Nick Heyward
Nik Kershaw
Odyssey
Paul Young
Pepsi & Shirlie
Rick Astley
Sinitta
The Three Degrees
T'Pau
Tony Hadley
Toyah
Visage
The Weather Girls

References

External links 

Official website
"Many happy returns" The Guardian
'The Eighties artists are back for Here and Now', Johnny Davis, The Times, 16 May 2009

Concert tours
Recurring events established in 2001